Martin Pierre d'Alvimare du Briou (18 September 1772 – 3 June 1839), sometimes spelled Dalvimare, was a French musician, harpist and composer. He was harp master of Queen Hortense.

Biography 
Martin Pierre d'Alvimare du Briou was born on 18 September 1772 at Dreux, of Pierre d'Alvimare du Briou, a lawyer in the Parliament and receiver of gabelles and Cécile Doury de Sacy. He received an excellent education, and at an early age learned drawing, as well as the harpsichord and harp. Noticed by Duke of Penthièvre residing in the nearby château d'Anet, he was introduced by the latter and Madame de Lamballe to the court at the age of 7, where he played in front of Queen Marie-Antoinette. In 1788, he composed his first opéra: Églé.

At the age of fourteen, he obtained the office of receiver of salt-tax of his father, but the charge did not interest him and it could be done by proxy. He therefore embarked on a military career and became a bodyguard of Louis XVI, which enabled him to compose at leisure. So he found himself at his post on 10 August 1792 and escaped miraculously to the massacre, taking refuge in the porter's house of one of his friends, who made him pass for his sick son.

Inscribed on the list of emigrants, he hid under another name. There was nothing left of the confiscated fortune of his father. In order to earn his living, he became a draftsman for a handkerchief factory near Dreux, under the name of Dalvimare.

During the Consulate, removed from the list of emigrants, he returned to Paris and resumed his musical activities successfully. He was admitted as harpist of the Paris Opéra in 1800 and as a musician in the chamber orchestra of Napoleon. In 1807 he had the title of harp master of Joséphine and of her daughter Hortense. Familiar of Malmaison, he frequented Talma, general Lauriston, and was an intimate friend of Méhul.

Having recovered the fortune he possessed before the Revolution, he resigned from all his posts in 1812 and retired to Dreux, where he spent the rest of his life painting and composing.

He was married to Anne Louise Didelot (died in 1804) then in 1812 to Alexandrine de Feuquières. Sick, he went to Paris for treatment and died there on 3 June 1839.

Works 
 Trois sonates pour harpe et violon ad libitum, op 2, 9, 12, 14, 15, 18 (3 per opus)
 Grande sonate pour harpe avec violon, op 33
 3 Duos pour harpe et piano, n° 1 op 22, n° 2 without opus, n° 3 op 31
 Concerto pour harpe et orchestre en ut majeur, op 30
 Premier et Deuxième duo pour 2 harpes
 Plusieurs morceaux pour cor et harpe composed with Frédéric Nicolas Duvernoy
 Symphonie concertante pour cor, harpe et orchestre, with Duvernoy (1798)

Harp 
 Recueil de romances, op 4, 13, 15, 20
 3 Sonates, op 14
 3 Grandes Sonates, op 18
 Thème varié pour harpe, op 21
 Scène pour la harpe, op 23
 Fantaisie sur le pas russe, op 24
 Airs russes variés, op 25
 Recueil d'airs connus pour la harpe
 Fantaisie et variations sur l'air de Léonce
 Air tyrolien varié
 Airs des Mystères d'Isis en pot-pourris et variés
 Fandango des Noces de Gamache varié
 Fantaisie sur l'air Mon cœur soupire
 Fantaisie sur l'air Un jeune troubadour
 Fantaisie sur un thème donné
 Fantaisie et douze variations sur un air piémontais
 Fantaisie et variations sur l'air Charmant ruisseau
 Airs et ouvertures d'opéras arrangés pour la harpe

Vocal music 
1788: Églé, opéra comique
1809: Le Mariage par imprudence, opéra comique

Sources 
 François-Joseph Fétis, Biographie universelle des musiciens et bibliographie générale de la musique
 Auguste Jal, Dictionnaire critique de biographie et d'histoire

External links 
 Martin-Pierre d'Alvimare
 Martin-Pierre d'Alvimare's discography on Discogs
 Martin-Pierre d'Alvimare on Presto classical
 Concerto for harp in C minor (audiofile)
 La harpe française entre deux révolutions

French classical composers
French male classical composers
French classical harpists
1772 births
People from Dreux
1839 deaths
Composers for harp